Maister (or Maisters) was launched in 1802 at Hull. She initially sailed to the Baltic, but then became a government transport until the end of the Napoleonic Wars. She twice sailed to India under a licence from the British East India Company (EIC). In her career she suffered at least three maritime mishaps before she was wrecked on 13 December 1822.

Career
Maister first appeared in Lloyd's Register (LR) in 1802.

On 18 August 1802 Maister, Cowham, master, arrived at Petersburg from Hull. In November Lloyd's List reported that as she was coming from Petersburg she had gotten on shore at Carlsheim, on the coast of Sweden, but was expected to be gotten off.

On 25 January 1809 the Maisters transport was coming from Spithead when she drove on to the Hospital Shoal. She lost two anchors and cables. She was later refloated and taken in to Portsmouth, Hampshire.

On 25 November 1813 Maister was on her way from Hull to Martinique when  ran into her off the Owers. The collision dismasted Maister, which went into Cowes the next day.

In 1813 the EIC had lost its monopoly on the trade between India and Britain. British ships were then free to sail to India or the Indian Ocean under a licence from the EIC.

Maister, Wiseman, master, Parkinson, owner, sailed for Bombay on 7 February 1816 under a licence from the EIC.

On 28 January 1819 Maister sailed to Fort William, India (Calcutta), again under a licence from the EIC.

Fate
On 13 December 1822, Maister, of Port Glasgow, Wokes, master, was sailing from St John, New Brunswick when she was wrecked on the Isle of Tyrie in the Inner Hebrides. Her crew were rescued, and it was expected that her cargo would be recovered.

Citations

References
 

1802 ships
Ships built in Kingston upon Hull
Maritime incidents in 1809
Maritime incidents in 1813
Maritime incidents in 1802
Maritime incidents in December 1822